The 1989 Copa del Rey Final was the 87th final of the Copa del Rey. The final was played at Vicente Calderón Stadium in Madrid, on 30 June 1989, being won by Real Madrid, who beat Real Valladolid 1–0.

Details

References

1989
Copa del Rey
Real Madrid CF matches
Real Valladolid matches